Emeterio González Silva (born April 11, 1973 in San Juan y Martínez, Pinar del Río) is a former Cuban javelin thrower, whose current personal best throw is 87.12 metres, achieved in June 2000 in Jena.

International competitions

Seasonal bests by year
1992 - 73.56
1995 - 82.64
1996 - 77.94
1997 - 83.56
1998 - 84.20
1999 - 84.32
2000 - 87.12
2001 - 82.77
2002 - 82.63
2003 - 81.72
2004 - 80.70
2005 - 80.50
2006 - 79.94
2007 - 70.61

External links

1973 births
Living people
Cuban male javelin throwers
Athletes (track and field) at the 1996 Summer Olympics
Athletes (track and field) at the 2000 Summer Olympics
Olympic athletes of Cuba
Athletes (track and field) at the 1995 Pan American Games
Athletes (track and field) at the 1999 Pan American Games
Athletes (track and field) at the 2003 Pan American Games
Pan American Games medalists in athletics (track and field)
Pan American Games gold medalists for Cuba
Universiade medalists in athletics (track and field)
World Athletics Championships athletes for Cuba
Central American and Caribbean Games gold medalists for Cuba
Competitors at the 1993 Central American and Caribbean Games
Competitors at the 1998 Central American and Caribbean Games
Universiade silver medalists for Cuba
Central American and Caribbean Games medalists in athletics
Medalists at the 1997 Summer Universiade
Medalists at the 1995 Pan American Games
Medalists at the 1999 Pan American Games
Medalists at the 2003 Pan American Games
People from Pinar del Río Province
20th-century Cuban people
21st-century Cuban people